Hans von Hahn (7 August 1914 – 5 November 1957) was a Luftwaffe ace and recipient of the Knight's Cross of the Iron Cross during World War II. The Knight's Cross of the Iron Cross was awarded to recognise extreme battlefield bravery or successful military leadership. During his career he was credited with 34 aerial victories, 15 on the Western Front and 19 on the Eastern Front.

World War II
World War II in Europe began on Friday 1 September 1939 when German forces invaded Poland. On 18 September 1939, Hahn was appointed Staffelkapitän of 8. Staffel (8th squadron) of Jagdgeschwader 53 (JG 53—53rd Fighter Wing). He was the first commander of the Staffel which was part of the newly created III. Gruppe (3rd group) of JG 53 under the command of Hauptmann Werner Mölders. Hahn claimed his first aerial victory on 22 December 1939 during "Phoney War". That day, he claimed a Royal Air Force (RAF) Hawker Hurricane fighter from the No. 73 Squadron.

On 27 August 1940, Hahn was appointed Gruppenkommandeur (group commander) of I. Gruppe of Jagdgeschwader 3 (JG 3—3rd Fighter Wing). He replaced Oberleutnant Lothar Keller who had temporarily led the Gruppe after its former commander Hauptmann Günther Lützow had been Geschwaderkommodore (wing commander) of JG 3 on 21 August. Command of 8. Staffel of JG 53 was given to Oberleutnant Hans Kunert.

War against the Soviet Union
In preparation for Operation Barbarossa, the German invasion of the Soviet Union, the I. Gruppe moved to an airfield at Dub on 18 June 1941. At the start of the campaign, JG 3 was subordinated to the V. Fliegerkorps (5th Air Corps), under command of General der Flieger Robert Ritter von Greim, which was part of Luftflotte 4 (4th Air Fleet), under command of Generaloberst Alexander Löhr. These air elements supported Generalfeldmarschall Gerd von Rundstedt's Heeresgruppe Süd (Army Group South), with the objective of capturing Ukraine and its capital Kiev.

Summary of career

Aerial victory claims
According to Obermaier, Hahn was credited with 34 aerial victories claimed in over combat missions. This figure includes 19 claims on the Eastern Front and 15 over the Western Allies. Mathews and Foreman, authors of Luftwaffe Aces — Biographies and Victory Claims, researched the German Federal Archives and found records for 31 aerial victory claims, plus three further unconfirmed claims. This figure of confirmed claims includes 19 aerial victories on the Eastern Front and 12 on the Western Front.

Awards
 Aviator badge
 Front Flying Clasp of the Luftwaffe
 Iron Cross (1939) 2nd and 1st Class
 Knight's Cross of the Iron Cross on 9 July 1941 as Hauptmann and Gruppenkommandeur of the I./Jagdgeschwader 3

References

Citations

Bibliography

External links
Aces of the Luftwaffe

1914 births
1957 deaths
Military personnel from Frankfurt
People from Hesse-Nassau
German World War II flying aces
Luftwaffe pilots
Recipients of the Knight's Cross of the Iron Cross